Ernest Kakhobwe (born 26 June 1993) is a Malawian footballer who plays as a goalkeeper for Nyasa Big Bullets and the Malawi national team. He was included in Malawi's squad for the 2021 Africa Cup of Nations.

References

External links

1993 births
Living people
Malawian footballers
People from Thyolo District
Association football goalkeepers
Mighty Tigers FC players
Nyasa Big Bullets FC players
Malawi international footballers
2021 Africa Cup of Nations players